Sidheshwari Laxminath Sanskrit College, is a public college in Gajahara. It is a finance affiliated unit of KSDS University, Darbhanga.

History
It was established on 26 January 1967 by Late Dr. Shri Krishna Mishra, Former H.O.D of English Dept. of LNMU, Darbhanga, First President of G.B. and the son of late Mahamahopadhyaya Jaydev Mishra with the donation of his widow sister Sidheshwari Devi and the local public. Late Krishnakant Mishra and Late Devkrishna Mishra played vital roles to manage the landed property for the establishment of the college. After 1984, the college was effected by negative different factors. In the meantime, Late Dr. Jaykant Mishra, Former Prof. and H.O.D of English Dept. of Allahabad University came to manage this college. The college got permanent affiliation and development. In this period, Dr. Dayakant Jha was the principal. Now, the college is a unique centre of tradition Sanskrit Literature, Vyakaran, Jyotish and Dharmashastra.

Location 
It is situated beside the Indo-Nepal Border in the rural area, 35 km far from the district headquarter Madhubani, 5 km from Khutauna Railway Station. It has a big campus with a built up area 7500 sq. ft. in remote rural and backward area of Bihar. It has several buildings like administrative, library, computer cell, modern Jyotish laboratory, canteen, teaching block, cycle shed, electricification and purified drinking water, along with a separate girls' hostel.

Department 
 Sahitya
 Vyakaran
 Jyotish
 Modern Subject

References 
 https://www.facebook.com/slscollegegajahara
 http://ksdsu.edu.in/colleges3.htm
 http://www.ugc.ac.in/recog_College.aspx

External links 
Official website

Universities and colleges in Bihar
Madhubani district
Educational institutions established in 1967
1967 establishments in Bihar